Florentine most commonly refers to:

 a person or thing from:
Florence, a city in Italy
Republic of Florence or the Florentine Republic
 the Florentine dialect of Italian or Tuscan language

Florentines frequently refers to:
 Masters of Florentine painting (14th-16th centuries)
 Florence dwellers

Florentine may also refer to:

Places
 Florentin, Tel Aviv, a neighborhood in the southern part of Tel Aviv, Israel
 Leone, Florentine and Carpathia Apartment Buildings, an historic property in Omaha
 Upper Florentine Valley, a region in Tasmania

People
 Isaac Florentine (born 1958), Israeli film director and martial artist
 Jim Florentine (born 1964), American comedian
 Mary Florentine, American psychologist
 Florentine Rost van Tonningen (1914–2007), Dutch National Socialist

Films
Florentine (film), a 1937 Austrian film
 The Florentine (film), a 1999 American film

Food
 Florentine (culinary term), a dish prepared with spinach and a creamy sauce.
 Florentine biscuit, an Italian pastry of nuts and fruit
Florentine, a very thick T-bone steak which is usually prepared rare

Other uses
Florentine Diamond, a lost diamond of Indian origin
 Florentine flogging, a BDSM practice

See also
Florentin (disambiguation)
Florentina (disambiguation)

Language and nationality disambiguation pages